Strahov may refer to:

 Strahov (Prague)
 Strahov Monastery, Prague
 Strahov Stadium
 Strahov (Horní Kozolupy), Tachov
 Strahov (868 m) – a hill south of Železná Ruda, Bohemian Forest

See also
 Strakhov, a surname